Lewis Allan Stevenson (born 5 January 1988) is a Scottish professional footballer who plays for Scottish Premiership club Hibernian as a left-back or a midfielder. He is currently the longest serving player at Hibs, having made his debut in September 2005, and holds the club record for league appearances. Stevenson is the only Hibs player ever to have won both the Scottish League Cup and the Scottish Cup, doing so in 2007 and 2016 respectively. He made his first full international appearance for Scotland in May 2018.

Career

Club
Stevenson attended Balwearie High School in his hometown of Kirkcaldy. He joined the Hibernian youth academy aged 14 and played for the Scotland schoolboys team in 2003. He made his competitive debut for Hibernian in a Scottish League Cup tie at Ayr United in September 2005 but did not make his first Scottish Premier League appearance until the opening day of the 2006–07 season. Stevenson became a first-team regular under the management of John Collins, and he was named man of the match in the 2007 Scottish League Cup Final victory.

Stevenson scored his first goal for the club in a 2–0 win against Inverness CT on 26 February 2011. The goal came after more than 100 appearances without one, and Stevenson admitted to not knowing what to do in celebration.

Stevenson played regularly for Hibernian during the 2011–12 season, and won the fans' player of the year award. This came during a season when Hibs struggled to avoid relegation and Stevenson admitted that there were few candidates for the fans to choose from. Pat Fenlon, who made Stevenson team captain for one game, became Stevenson's sixth manager in seven years at Hibs during 2011–12. His number of appearances during the 2011–12 season meant that his contract was automatically extended for another year.

Early in the 2012–13 season, Stevenson suffered a broken toe during an Edinburgh derby match. He returned to the first team three weeks ahead of schedule. Stevenson provided cover at left-back for defensive injuries and he earned praise from Pat Fenlon for his performance in an Edinburgh derby victory in the 2012–13 Scottish Cup. Stevenson was also used at right-back during the 2012–13 season. He agreed a new two-year contract with Hibs in March 2013.

In December 2013, Stevenson recorded his 200th competitive appearance for Hibs. At this time, manager Terry Butcher deployed Stevenson as a left midfielder. This change produced rewards, as Stevenson scored the second goal of his career in a game against Kilmarnock, then won a match-winning penalty against Hearts.

Stevenson made his 250th appearance for the club in the fifth round of the 2014–15 Scottish Cup, becoming only the 60th player to record as many appearances since 1885. Stevenson was named captain for the game, a 3–1 win against Arbroath, to mark his achievement. In his following game for the club, Stevenson scored only his fourth career goal as Hibs won 2–0 against Rangers at Ibrox.

During the 2015 close season, Stevenson signed a new two-year contract with Hibs. He was part of the Hibs team that won the 2015–16 Scottish Cup, defeating Rangers 3–2 in the final. In doing so, he became the first player to win both Scottish national cup competitions with Hibernian. After helping the team win promotion in 2016–17, he signed a two-year contract with Hibs in May 2017. Stevenson was also awarded a testimonial match, played against Sunderland in July 2017.

In November 2018, his contract with Hibs was extended to the end of the 2020–21 season. He was voted Hibs' Supporters' Association Player of the Year in 2018–19, and He has twice been voted Young Player of the Year in the past and received a Special Recognition award in 2014 by the Association. On 11 January 2021, Stevenson made his 500th competitive appearance for Hibs. A limited edition shirt was released to mark this landmark, with proceeds going to the Hanlon Stevenson Foundation. In January 2021, Stevenson agreed to a new contract with Hibs that is due to run until the summer of 2022.

In November 2021, Stevenson agreed to extend his contract with Hibernian to the end of the 2022–23 season. During that season, he set a new club record for league games played, as he made his 450th appearance in a 1–0 win at St Mirren on 4 February 2023.

International
Stevenson played eight times for the Scotland under-21 team between August 2007 and November 2008.

On 14 May 2018, aged 30, Stevenson was called up to the Scotland senior squad for the first time. He made his full Scotland debut on 29 May 2018, in a 2–0 defeat to Peru.

Career statistics

Honours
Hibernian
 Scottish Cup: 2015–16
 Scottish League Cup: 2006–07
 Scottish Championship:  2016–17

See also
List of footballers in Scotland by number of league appearances (500+)
 List of Hibernian F.C. players 
 List of one-club men in association football

Notes

References

1988 births
Association football fullbacks
Association football midfielders
Hibernian F.C. players
Living people
People educated at Balwearie High School
Scotland under-21 international footballers
Scotland youth international footballers
Scottish footballers
Scottish Premier League players
Scottish Professional Football League players
Footballers from Kirkcaldy
Scotland international footballers